Saure Wochen – frohe Feste is an East German film. It was released in 1950.

External links
 

1950 films
East German films
1950s German-language films
German black-and-white films
1950s German films